Conception Island is a small island (0.603 km2) in the Seychelles 2 km west of Mahé. Conception contained a coconut plantation until the mid-1970s; today it is uninhabited. Conception Island, along with its sister island Thérèse Island, is part of Port Glaud district of Mahé, the main island of the Seychelles.

Recently the island has been created as a wildlife reserve. It is the home of the extremely rare Seychelles white-eye and other birds such as the Seychelles kestrel, Seychelles blue pigeon and the Malagasy turtle-dove. It also has two species of gecko.

Image gallery

References

External links 

 Official Conception Island Guide
 National Bureau of Statistics
 info
 Mahe Map 2015
 Info on the island

Islands of Port Glaud
Uninhabited islands of Seychelles
Important Bird Areas of Seychelles